Zinza (Dzinda) is a Bantu language of Tanzania, spoken on the southern shore of Lake Victoria.

References

Languages of Tanzania
Great Lakes Bantu languages